is a Shinto shrine located in the city of Echizen, Fukui Prefecture, Japan.

This Hachiman shrine was established in 891 as a branch of the Iwashimizu Hachiman-gu in Kyoto as the primary shrine of Nanjō District.  During the Genpei War, the shrine served as the headquarters for Kiso Yoshinaka in 1183, and was rebuilt by Shiba Takatsune during the Kenmu Restoration of 1334–38. The shrine was patronized by the Asakura clan in the Sengoku period and by the Matsudaira clan of Fukui Domain during the Edo period. In the former Modern system of ranked Shinto Shrines, it was a prefectural shrine (県社, Ken-sha).

The Haiden of the shrine dates from the Muromachi period and is registered as an Important Cultural Property

See also
Hachiman shrine

References

External links

Official website
Shinto Jinja Database

Shinto shrines in Fukui Prefecture
9th-century establishments in Japan
Echizen, Fukui
Echizen Province
Hachiman shrines
Religious buildings and structures completed in 891